Victoria A. Brownworth (born February 1959 or 1960) is an American journalist, writer, and editor. Throughout the 1980s and '90s, she wrote numerous award-winning articles about AIDS in women, children, and people of color. She was the first person in the United States to write a column about lesbianism in a daily newspaper and host a lesbian radio show.

In 1983, Brownworth reported on the "corruption at a Philadelphia based social service agency." She has also won the Lambda Literary Award for Lesbian Mystery for her 2016 novel Ordinary Mayhem.

Brownworth uses "she" and "they" pronouns.

Personal life 
In her early-to-mid-thirties, Brownworth started experiencing a number of symptoms she chalked up to being overworked (e.g., general malaise and difficulty walking). In one 18-month period, she broke 13 bones due to her symptoms, though she still believed nothing was seriously wrong. However, when she went blind due to optic neuritis, she visited a doctor who diagnosed her with primary progressive multiple sclerosis, a diagnosis she resisted for over a year. In 1994, she began to use a wheelchair, which she has used on and off since.

Brownworth has also had breast cancer, has a damaged heart, and "a spot on [her] lung."

Brownworth lives in Philadelphia. She and her partner, Maddy Gold, met while attending the Philadelphia High School for Girls and dated off and on for years. Brownworth and Gold had been living together for many years when in 2014 Pennsylvania deemed the ban on same-sex marriage to be unconstitutional, and Brownworth immediately proposed. They were married in October of that year on their 15-year anniversary. Gold died of cancer on Nov. 12, 2022.

Education and career 
Brownworth published her first book of poetry at age 18 and began writing for Philadelphia Gay News when she was 17.

Brownworth studied American studies and women's history at the Temple University and represented the university at the first National Women's Studies Association. Near graduation, she became the star witness "in the first federal police brutality trial in Philadelphia." The police were acquitted, and she began her career in advocacy journalism.

In the 1980s and early 1990s, Brownworth worked for the Philadelphia Inquirer and Philadelphia Daily News. She was the first open lesbian to have a daily column, and may have been the first to have a daily column about lesbian issues. Later, she became the first person to host a lesbian radio program in the United States, Amazon Country on WXPN-FM.

In 1993, after being diagnosed with multiple sclerosis, Brownworth began focusing primarily on writing books and editing anthologies.

She has also been a contributing editor for Curve and Lambda Literary Review and has been a regular contributing writer for SheWired, Advocate, The Independent, and HuffPost.

In 2010, Brownworth co-founded Tiny Satchel Press, a  publishing company that printed young adult books featuring characters from systemically marginalized populations.

Brownworth has won the Society of Professional Journalism Award and the NLGJA Award.

Controversy

Transphobia controversy
Since 1981, Brownworth has campaigned for her view that trans women are not real women and should be barred from awards and participation in programs for women.

Awards

Publications

Anthology contributions 
 Women of Mystery: An Anthology (2006)
 Fantasy: Untrue Stories of Lesbian Passion (2007)
 Wild Nights: (Mostly) True Stories of Women Loving Women (2007)
 Persistence: All Ways Butch and Femme (2011)
 Women of the Mean Streets (2011)
 Night Shadows: Queer Horror (2012)

Anthologies edited 
 Out for Blood (1995)
 Night Bites: Vampire Stories by Women Tales of Blood and Lust (1996)
 Out for More Blood (1996)
 Night Shade: Gothic Tales by Women, with Judith M.  Redding (1999)
 Restricted Access: Lesbians on Disability (1999)
 Coming Out of Cancer: Writings from the Lesbian Cancer Epidemic (2000)
 Bed: New Lesbian Erotica (2007)
 The Golden Age of Lesbian Erotica: 1920-1940, with Judith M.  Redding (2007)
 From Where We Sit: Black Writers Write Black Youth (2011)
 Ordinary Mayhem (2015)

Books written 
 Film Fatales: Independent Women Directors, with Judith M. Redding (1997)
 Day of the Dead (2009)
 Ordinary Mayhem (2015)
 Erasure (2017)
 Sleep So Deep (2017)

Essay collections 
 Too Queer: Essays from a Radical Life (1996)

References 

Living people
American lesbian writers
Writers with disabilities
Writers from Philadelphia
People with multiple sclerosis
20th-century American non-fiction writers
21st-century American non-fiction writers
20th-century American journalists
Temple University alumni
1960 births
20th-century American women writers
21st-century American women writers
21st-century American novelists
American LGBT novelists
LGBT people from Pennsylvania
Novelists from Pennsylvania
Journalists from Pennsylvania
American LGBT journalists
American women journalists
Lambda Literary Award winners